"I giorni dell'arcobaleno" ("The Days of the Rainbow") is a single by Italian singer Nicola Di Bari. The song was the winner of the Sanremo Music Festival 1972 and later went on to represent  at the Eurovision Song Contest 1972 in Edinburgh, United Kingdom. It marked the second Sanremo Festival victory in a row for Di Bari, an accomplishment only achieved by two other artists, Nilla Pizzi and Domenico Modugno.

Background 
Described as "minimalist, graceful and lyrical", the song is a nostalgic ballad, with Di Bari singing to a woman about her childhood, which she gave up by taking a lover at a very young age; and while this action, being a passage into adulthood, made her appear "cool" before her more innocent peers and transformed her into a self-assured young woman, she did in fact forsake what was – or could have been – "the best time" of her life. The lyrics of the song underwent several censorship changes, including the raising of the girl's age by three years, and the suppression of a verse referring to previous romantic experiences.

At Eurovision 
The song was performed twelfth on the night of the Eurovision Song Contest, following 's Milestones with "Falter im Wind" and preceding 's Tereza Kesovija with "Muzika i ti"). At the close of voting, it had received 92 points, placing it 6th in a field of 18.

It was succeeded as Italian representative at the 1973 contest by Massimo Ranieri with "Chi sarà con te".

Charts

References  

Eurovision songs of Italy
Eurovision songs of 1972
Sanremo Music Festival songs
Nicola Di Bari songs
1972 songs